Mauro Biello (born August 8, 1972) is a Canadian professional assistant coach and former player who has been an assistant coach of the Canada men's national team since 2018. He played as a forward for several Canadian and American lower division clubs, namely Montreal Supra, Buffalo Blizzard, Rochester Raging Rhinos, and Toronto Thunderhawks. He also spent a total of 16 seasons with the second division Montreal Impact, for whom he is the all-time statistical leader in goals and appearances, with over 80 goals and over 300 games for the team. As a Canadian international, he was capped four times from 1995 until 2000.

As a manager, he served as the head coach of Montreal Impact from 2015 until 2017.

Early life

Born in Montreal, Quebec, Biello attended St. Monica's Elementary School, Vincent Massey Collegiate and Marymount Academy, and played college soccer at Vanier College and Concordia University.

Club career

Early career 
Biello began his professional soccer career in 1992 when he was drafted by the Montreal Supra.

Montreal Impact 
A year later, the team folded and Biello signed with the newly formed expansion team, the Montreal Impact of the American Professional Soccer League. Biello helped the Impact capture the League Championship for the first time in 1994, but Biello played a small part in capturing the Championship. In 1997, Biello helped the Impact win the regular-season title by scoring 8 goals and recording 10 assists. He was awarded the Giuseppe-Saputo Trophy as the Impact's Team MVP. In addition to playing for Montreal during the outdoor season, Biello also spent two seasons, 1995–1997, with the Buffalo Blizzard in the National Professional Soccer League. In 1997, the Impact entered the NPSL. Consequently, Biello played both indoor and outdoor seasons with Montreal.

During the 1998 outdoor season, Biello played a major part for the Impact, scoring 11 goals and amassing 35 points (a team record that stood until the 2002 season, when Eduardo Sebrango surpassed it with 18 goals and 36 points). At the end of the season he was awarded the Giuseppe-Saputo Trophy for the second straight year.

Rochester Raging Rhinos 
In 1999, Biello left the Impact because the new ownership decided not to play the 1999 outdoor season in order to better prepare the 1999-2000 indoor season, which left him to sign with rivals the Rochester Raging Rhinos. With Rochester, Biello enjoyed much success; he was Rochester's leading scorer with eight goals and four assists. He also helped the Rhinos win the U.S. Open Cup for the very first time and helped reach the championship game, which Rochester lost to the Minnesota Thunder.

Return to Montreal Impact 
In 2000, Biello returned to the Impact, but the Impact didn't qualify for the playoffs that season. As the Impact was no longer playing indoor soccer, Biello spent the winter of 2000–01 with the Toronto Thunderhawks in the NPSL. In 2001, Impact coach Valerio Gazzola chose Biello to be the captain of the Montreal Impact. That year, the Impact had a struggling season both on and off the field. The team missed the playoffs for the second straight year. Biello lead the team in scoring with eight goals and again was awarded the Giuseppe-Saputo Trophy.

In 2004, Biello led the Impact to win the club's second league championship, beating the Seattle Sounders. That same year, he helped the Impact win the Voyageurs Cup for the third straight year.

In 2005, he helped the Impact play a 15-game streak without a loss (10-0-5), setting a new league record. He was the Impact's leading scorer in 2005, following a production of nine goals and three assists for a total of 21 points. Biello also was a finalist for League MVP honors, losing to Jason Jordan, and for the fourth time in his career he was awarded the Giuseppe-Saputo Trophy. Mauro also helped the Impact capture the Voyageurs Cup for a fourth straight year. On December 7, 2005 Biello signed a two-year deal with the Impact.

On July 13, 2007 he played his 300th career game with the Impact against the Carolina RailHawks, making him the first Impact player to reach that milestone as well as the first player in USL history to play 300 games with the same team.

On January 5, 2009 the Montreal Impact announced that Biello and veteran midfielder Patrick Leduc had both accepted contract extensions for the 2009 season. During the 2009 USL season Biello contributed by helping the Impact clinch a playoff spot under new head coach Marc Dos Santos. He helped the Impact reach the finals where Montreal would face the Vancouver Whitecaps FC, this marking the first time in USL history where the final match would consist of two Canadian clubs. In the final Biello helped the Impact win the series 6–3 on aggregate. The victory gave the Impact their third USL Championship and also the victory marked Biello's third USL Championship. Once the season came to a conclusion Biello announced his retirement from competitive soccer on November 19, 2009.

International 
Biello played in two of Canada's three games at the 1989 FIFA U-16 World Championship in Scotland.

Senior team 
He made his senior debut for the Canada national team on May 28, 1995 in a match against Chile. He earned a total of four caps, scoring no goals. His final international was a January 2000 friendly match against Trinidad and Tobago.

Managerial career

Montreal Impact 
Biello joined the coaching staff of the Montreal Impact in 2009 and became the interim head coach on August 30, 2015, after Frank Klopas was fired, a day after a 2–1 loss to Toronto FC. Montreal won 4–3 in his first match as interim head coach. Biello guided the team to the Eastern Conference semi-finals where they were eliminated by Columbus Crew. Biello had the interim tag removed after guiding the Impact into the playoffs. The Montreal Impact finished fifth in the Eastern Conference and got to the Eastern Conference final where they eliminated by Toronto FC. In 2017, the Impact struggled, winning just 11 games, against 17 losses and 6 draws. Biello was fired the day after the season ended.

Canada 
In February 2018, Canada Soccer hired Biello as assistant coach to the Canada men's national team under head coach John Herdman.

Career statistics

Club

Managerial statistics

Honours

Player
Montreal Impact
APSL Championship: 1994
USL First Division Championship: 2004, 2009
USL First Division Commissioners Cup: 1995, 1996, 1997, 2005, 2006
Voyageurs Cup Champions: 2002, 2003, 2004, 2005, 2006, 2007, 2008
Rochester Raging Rhinos
U.S. Open Cup: 1999

Individual

Number 20 retired by Montreal Impact

Personal 
His sons plays soccer too, Gabriele played in the Academy of Montreal Impact and is currently in the roster of the Soccer team of Dawson College (Blues); and Alessandro plays for CF Montréal Academy, as well the Canada men's national under-17 soccer team.

References

External links
 Montreal Impact bio
 
 

1972 births
Living people
Soccer players from Montreal
Canadian people of Argentine descent
Canadian sportspeople of Italian descent
Anglophone Quebec people
Association football forwards
Canadian soccer players
Canada men's international soccer players
Canadian expatriate soccer players
Canadian expatriate sportspeople in the United States
Montreal Supra players
Montreal Impact (1992–2011) players
Buffalo Blizzard players
Rochester New York FC players
Toronto ThunderHawks players
Canadian Soccer League (1987–1992) players
American Professional Soccer League players
National Professional Soccer League (1984–2001) players
USL First Division players
Expatriate soccer players in the United States
Concordia University alumni
A-League (1995–2004) players
Canada men's youth international soccer players
CF Montréal non-playing staff
CF Montréal coaches
Canadian soccer coaches